Cadet College Rawalpindi, known as CCR, is a private college at Chakri Interchange, Islamabad-Lahore Motorway M-2, Rawalpindi, Pakistan.

History
CCR is a project of the Pakistan Education Development Organization. Pakistan Education Development Organization (PEDO, LTD) is a private NGO, run by retired senior naval officers from Pakistan Navy and Education Directorate who joined hands under the leadership of Commander (R) Muhammad Sibtain Shah Hamdani, who was the pioneer founder of private sector Cadet Colleges in Pakistan since 1996. Cdr. (R) Sibtain Shah Hamdani, during his service in Pakistan Navy, held key positions in the Education Directorate of Pakistan Navy and initiated many new projects in education for the Pakistan Navy, while being assigned to run and establish curriculum and administration for projects like Bahria College Islamabad, Bahria University in 1996.after retirement had been actively involved in education projects and construction for Pakistan Navy and his company (METCO Engineering LTD) had undertaken projects like Bahria College Islamabad extension, Pakistan Navy Model School, Bahria University extension and a number of private boarding schools' projects, which were run under Shah's assistance.

Shah, while having a keen interest for education and understanding its importance for the future generations, always believed in imparting quality education to the masses. Discipline plays an important role in a young child's life and it grooms him to become a responsible and humble citizen to serve the humanity.

PEDO LTD, was formed with the intention, by Senior Naval Officers under leadership of Shah, to cater for quality education in Pakistan. Cadet College Rawalpindi was established in 2005 near Chakri Interchange on Islamabad - Lahore Motorway. A healthy environment requires ample space, specific blocks and a spacious campus with all sports and academic facilities, which was from the very first day kept in mind by the Management.

External links 
 CCR website
 Cadet College Rawalpindi Facebook page

Universities and colleges in Rawalpindi District